Nahla is a 1979 Algerian drama film directed by Farouk Beloufa. It was entered into the 11th Moscow International Film Festival where Yasmine Khlat won the award for Best Actress.

Cast
 Roger Assaf as Nasri
 Yasmine Khlat as Nahla
 Lina Tebbara as Maha
 Faek Homaissi as Raouf
 Youcef Saïah as the journalist

References

External links
 

1979 films
1979 drama films
1970s Arabic-language films
Algerian drama films